Anastasia Pavlyuchenkova and Urszula Radwańska were the defending champions but did not compete in the Juniors this year.

Polona Hercog and Jessica Moore defeated Isabella Holland and Sally Peers in the final, 6–3, 1–6, 6–2 to win the girls' doubles tennis title at the 2008 Wimbledon Championships.

Seeds

  Elena Bogdan /  Bojana Jovanovski (quarterfinals)
  Ana Bogdan /  Ksenia Lykina (second round)
  Mallory Burdette /  Melanie Oudin (first round)
  Elena Chernyakova /  Nikola Hofmanova (second round)
  Lesley Kerkhove /  Arantxa Rus (quarterfinals)
  Polona Hercog /  Jessica Moore (champions)
  Cindy Chala /  Noppawan Lertcheewakarn (first round)
  Tímea Babos /  Réka Luca Jani (quarterfinals)

Draw

Finals

Top half

Bottom half

References

External links

Girls' Doubles
Wimbledon Championship by year – Girls' doubles